Two Concert Études (Zwei Konzertetüden), S.145, is a set of two piano works composed in Rome around 1862/63 by Franz Liszt and dedicated to Dionys Pruckner, but intended for Sigmund Lebert and Ludwig Stark’s Klavierschule. It consists of two parts: "Waldesrauschen" (Forest Murmurs) and "Gnomenreigen" (Dance of the Gnomes).


Details
"Waldesrauschen", in D-flat major, is the first of the two pieces in this set. It is known for its beauty and imitation of wind in the forest.

"Gnomenreigen" is in F-sharp minor. It is known for its technical difficulty in its fast and soft passages, where the pianist imitates the sound of gnomes. It first has a theme in F-sharp minor consisting of grace notes followed by eights. Then it goes to a fast, playful theme in A major. It repeats themes, and also has a theme with repeating bass notes, such as the fifty-four consecutive low Ds. Finally, the A major theme is repeated for a climactic part of the étude, this time in F-sharp major.

Notes and references

Notes

References

External links 
 

Études by Franz Liszt
1863 compositions

Compositions in D-flat major
Compositions in F-sharp minor